The Roberts Island complex is an archaeological site in Citrus County, Florida, near the Gulf of Mexico, dating from the late Woodland period. It is located on an island in the Crystal River midway between the springs at the head of the river and the mouth of the river on the Gulf of Mexico. The site is a geographically separate unit of the Crystal River Archaeological State Park. The site includes three shell mounds and three middens. Two of the mounds may have had stepped sides. The Roberts Island complex was developed as the Crystal River site declined and most other ceremonial sites in the region were abandoned during the 7th or 8th century.

Description
Roberts Island divides Crystal River and Salt River, a distributary of Crystal River, as they diverge. Both rivers are tidal. Prairie hammock is the primary habitat on Roberts Island, with adjoining tidal marshes and shell mounds. The shell mounds on Roberts Island are covered by a closed canopy forest. The shell mounds on Roberts Island are believed to have mainly been created in hydric or prairie hammocks on outcrops of limestone, although some may have been created in tidal marshes along the rivers. Most of Roberts Island is largely undisturbed, although two houses remain in private hands. While all of the Crystal River site is included in the site designation 8CI1, various features in the Roberts Island complex have been assigned the site designations 8CI36, 8CI37, 8CI39, 8CI40, 8CI41 and 8CI576. Roberts Island was added to the park in 1996.

While the Crystal River Site (Crystal River Mounds) has been studied for more than a century (Clarence Bloomfield Moore published a description of the largest mound at the Crystal River site in 1903), the mounds on Roberts Island did not attract attention from archaeologists until the 1950s, when Ripley and Adelaide Bullen reported on the features now designated as 8CI36, 8CI37, 8CI39, 8CI40, and 8CI41. The feature designated 8CI576 was first described by Gary Ellis in 1993. The Florida Department of Environmental Protection regards the cultural resources of the Roberts Island complex to be comparable to those of the Crystal River site.

Mound A
The island is covered almost entirely by a midden, on which Mound A was built. People apparently started living on a small island in the marsh on a surface that is now just above mean high tide, when the mean sea level in the area was about  lower than today. Radiocarbon dates indicate the initial occupation of the island started between 571 and 747. Mound A was built of oyster shell on top of the midden, apparently contemporaneous with the deposit of the top layer of the midden. The long axis of the mound runs north-south.

Mound A is covered in a layer (Stratum I) of loamy sand that is very dark brown in color and contains small amounts of crushed shell. Below that is a layer (Stratum II) of loamy sand that is dark grey, with some crushed shell. The material beneath the surface layers (Stratum III) consists of intact oyster shells (valves). Pluckhahn, Thomas and Rink report that the mound shows evidence of having stepped sides. A trench excavated on one side of the mound, and ground-penetrating radar (GPR) transects of the mound revealed alternating horizontal and sloped (approximately 45°) elements, with anomalies in the radar transects corresponding to breaks between Stratum II and Stratum III in the stratigraphy in the walls of the trench. The stepped anomalies in the GPR profile appeared on both the north and the south side of the mound, as well as one adjacent to the excavated trench on the west side of the mound. The GPR profile is consistent with the interior of the mound being made entirely of oyster shells. Pluckhahn, Thomas and Rink interpret that consistency to mean that the perceived steps are not the result of random placement of basket loads of shell during construction of the mound. Some of the steps were more evident that others in the sides of the excavated trench. Steps have not been found on other mounds on the Gulf coast of peninsular Florida.

Mound A was built of oyster shells with very little other material present. Various evidence suggests the mound was constructed in a single phase. The size of the shells and isotope analysis of the shells indicate that they were all harvested in the late fall and winter. Pluckhahn, Thompson and Rink suggest that the mound may have been constructed in less than a year. While the summit was not excavated, no evidence of a structure on top of the mound was found.

Mound B
Site 8CI40 (Crystal River 6/CR-6) is a small island northeast of Mound A, almost completely covered by a rectangular mound. The mound was constructed of oyster shell, and is about the same age as Mound A. The top of the mound is occupied by a house built in the 1950s. Similar to Mound A, Mound B has two relatively thin surface layers. Stratum I is composed of very dark brown loamy sand, but includes many historic and more recent artifacts connected to the 20th century house on the mound. Stratum II, as in Mound A, consists of dark grey loamy sand with some crushed shell. The core of Mound B, similar to the core of Mound A, consists of intact oyster shells. Radiocarbon dates and the composition of ceramics found indicate that the construction of Mound B was contemporaneous with Mound A, in or around the 11th century A.D.

Mound C
Mound C was also constructed with oyster shells. The period when Mound C was constructed has not been established. Pluckhahn, Thomas and Rink suggest that the (approximate) isosceles triangle formed by the three mounds, along with the similar ages of the mounds, indicate that they formed an "integrated architectural complex." The three mounds surround the area that may have been a plaza on the east side of Mound A.

Middens
8CI36 (Crystal River 2/CR-2) is a shell midden  in diameter. 8CI37 (Crystal River 3/CR-3) is a shell midden  in diameter. Weeden Island and Safety Harbor pottery have been found in 8CI37. 8CI39 (Crystal River 5/CR-5) is described as a narrow shell ridge. Deptford, Weeden Island and Safety Harbor pottery have been found in 8CI39.

Successor to Crystal River
A ceremonial center at the Crystal River site originated very early in the current era, likely at some time between 69 and 225. It became a major ceremonial center, described as the southern-most major ceremonial location associated with the Hopewell tradition, but it declined by the 7th or 8th century and had been abandoned as a ceremonial center by the 10th century, although some people continued to live on part of the site. The pottery traditions at the Crystal River site were substantially continued at Roberts Island, indicating a gradual shift of population and ceremonial importance from the Crystal River site to the Roberts Island site. However, ceremonial feasts at Roberts Island were dominated by oysters and other bivalves, while meat from mammals, which had been made up almost half the food at feasts at Crystal River, almost disappeared in feasts at Roberts Island.

Notes

References

Sources

Further reading

 - mismatch on title of article

Native American museums in Florida
Museums in Citrus County, Florida
Archaeological museums in Florida
Archaeological sites in Florida
State parks of Florida
Parks in Citrus County, Florida
Archaeological parks
Crystal River, Florida
Mounds in Florida
Native American history of Florida